Atlético La Sabana was a Colombian football (soccer) team, based in Sincelejo, Colombia. The club was founded in late 2008 and plays in Categoría Primera B as of 2009. The club was formerly known as Córdoba F.C. based in Córdoba, Colombia but due to financial difficulties, the club relocated to Sincelejo and was rebranded.

In 2011 due to financial problems, the team was sold to the Universidad Autónoma del Caribe and refounded as Universidad Autónoma F.C.

Club history
???? - foundation as Itagui Florida SC.

2005 - renamed as Florida Soccer Club Medellin.

2006 - renamed as Corporacion Deportiva Córdoba Fútbol Club.

2009 - relocated to Sincelejo and renamed as Corporación Deportiva Atlético La Sabana.

Source:

Notable players
 Nelson Asprilla
 Hernán Burbano
 Diego Causado

References

External links
 dimayor.com.co Profile

Football clubs in Colombia
Association football clubs established in 2008
2008 establishments in Colombia
Categoría Primera B clubs